Hemdat Israel Synagogue is a synagogue founded in 1899 and located in the quarter of Haydarpaşa in Kadıköy, on the Asian side of Istanbul, Turkey. Visits and participation to prayers are possible after contacting the Chief Rabbinate.

See also
 History of the Jews in Turkey
 List of synagogues in Turkey

References and notes

External links
 Chief Rabbinate of Turkey
 Shalom Newspaper - The main Jewish newspaper in Turkey

Synagogues in Istanbul
Synagogues completed in 1899
Kadıköy
Synagogues in the Ottoman Empire
19th-century religious buildings and structures in Turkey